Noli me tangere (Latin for Don't touch me or Stop touching me) is a c. 1514 painting by Titian of the Noli me tangere episode in St John's Gospel. The painting, depicting Jesus and Mary Magdalene soon after the resurrection, is in oil on canvas and since the nineteenth century has been in the collection of the National Gallery in London.

References

External links
 
 National Gallery page

1514 paintings
Paintings by Titian in the National Gallery, London
Titian